Orania xuthedra is a species of sea snail, a marine gastropod mollusk in the family Muricidae, the murex snails or rock snails.

Description

Distribution
This marine species occurs off Sri Lanka.

References

External linkjs
  Melvill, J. C. (1893). Descriptions of twenty-five new species of marine shells from Bombay collected by Alexander Abercrombie, Esq. Memoirs and proceedings of the Manchester Literary & Philosophical Society. 7: 52-67, 1 pl.

Gastropods described in 1893
Orania (gastropod)